Alex Arthur Rufer (born 12 June 1996) is a New Zealand professional footballer who captains and plays as a defensive midfielder for Wellington Phoenix in the A-League.

Personal life
Rufer is the son of former international New Zealand player Shane Rufer, and the nephew of Oceania Player of the Century Wynton Rufer. He also attended Palmerston North Boys High School.

Club career
Rufer started his career with YoungHeart Manawatu.

In February 2013, Rufer joined Wairarapa United.

In August 2013, ahead of the A-League season, Rufer signed a three-year contract with Wellington Phoenix. Rufer made his debut for the Wellington Phoenix in the 3–2 away win against Newcastle Jets on 9 February 2014.

In a 2–1 loss against Brisbane Roar on 12 March 2022, Rufer suffered an anterior cruciate ligament (ACL) rupture. He was expected to return from injury 12 months later.

International career
Rufer made his international debut for the All Whites in a friendly match against Myanmar on 7 September 2015, coming on for Jeremy Brockie in the 72nd minute.

References

External links
 

1996 births
Living people
Footballers from Geneva
New Zealand association footballers
New Zealand international footballers
New Zealand youth international footballers
New Zealand people of Swiss descent
Swiss men's footballers
Swiss people of New Zealand descent
Association football midfielders
Wellington Phoenix FC players
A-League Men players
New Zealand Football Championship players
New Zealand Māori sportspeople
2017 FIFA Confederations Cup players